The first season of Ellada Eheis Talento premiered on March 23, 2007, and ended on June 15, 2007. It was hosted by actress and television presenter Sophia Aliberti. The judges of the Greek show were Ilias Psinakis, singers' manager, Vaggelis Perris, TV and radio producer and Matthildi Maggira, actress, TV presenter and comedian. The winner of the first series was 12-year-old singer Christos Zacharopoulos.

2007 Greek television seasons